Qakare Ibi was an ancient Egyptian pharaoh during the early First Intermediate Period (2181–2055 BC) and the 14th ruler of the Eighth Dynasty. As such Qakare Ibi's seat of power was Memphis and he probably did not hold power over all of Egypt. Qakare Ibi is one of the best attested pharaohs of the Eighth Dynasty due to the discovery of his small pyramid in South Saqqara.

Attestations
Qakare Ibi is attested on the 53rd entry of the Abydos King List, a king list which was redacted some 900 years after the First Intermediate Period during the reign of Seti I. According to Kim Ryholt's latest reconstruction of the Turin canon, another king list compiled in the Ramesside era, Qakare Ibi is also attested there on column 5, line 10 (Gardiner 4.11, von Beckerath 4.10). The Turin canon further indicates that he reigned for "2 years, 1 month and 1 day". The only other attestion for Qakare Ibi is his pyramid in South Saqqara.

Pyramid complex
Qakare Ibi was buried in a small pyramid at Saqqara-South. It was discovered by Karl Richard Lepsius in the 19th century who listed it as the number XL in his pioneering list of pyramids.
The pyramid was excavated from 1929 until 1931 by Gustave Jéquier.

Ibi's pyramid is the last built in Saqqara, located to the northeast of Shepseskaf's tomb and near the causeway of the Pyramid of Pepi II. It is very similar in plan, dimensions and decorations to the pyramids of the queens of Pepi II, the last great pharaoh of the Old Kingdom. Consequently, it was proposed that the pyramid was originally that of Ankhnespepi IV (ˁnḫ-n=s ppj, "Pepi lives for her") a wife of Pepi II, and was only later appropriated by Ibi. Adjacent to the pyramid is a small chapel where the funerary cult took place. No trace of a causeway nor of a valley temple has been found to this day, and it is likely that there never was any.

The pyramid 
Ibi's pyramid is not oriented to any cardinal point, being rather on a northwest–southeast axis. The core of the pyramid was built with limestone blocks of local origin, most of which are now gone, probably reused in later constructions. On some of the remaining blocks, inscriptions in red ink were found mentioning a chief of the Libyans, the meaning of which is unclear. It seems that even though the foundations for the outer casing of the pyramid were laid, the casing itself was never mounted.

Internal structures
Behind this portcullis lay the king's burial chamber. Both the corridor and the walls of the burial chamber were inscribed with the last known instance of the Pyramid Texts. The texts seem to have been directly inscribed for Ibi rather than appropriated by him. Jéquier judged the quality of the inscriptions as "very average". Furthermore, the placement of the spells appears relatively indiscriminate. The burial chamber's ceiling was flat and decorated with stars. Today a large block of concrete protects the chamber.

On the west side of the burial chamber is a false door and a huge granite block on which once stood the sarcophagus of the king. On the east side there is a serdab for the statue of the Ka of the deceased.

Chapel
Adjacent to the east side of the pyramid is a small mudbrick chapel which served as temple for the cult of the dead king. The entrance of the chapel is located on its north side. Inside the temple, immediately against the pyramid wall is an offering hall where Jequier found a stone washbasin as well as stele or a false door of which only the foundations remain. An alabaster tray and obsidian mortar tools were also discovered there.

The south part of the chapel is occupied by magazine rooms.

See also
List of Egyptian pyramids
List of megalithic sites

References

Bibliography
 Mark Lehner. The secret of the pyramids of Egypt, Orbis, Munich 1999, p. 164
 Christopher Theis: The Pyramids of the First Intermediate Period. After philological and archaeological sources (= studies of ancient Egyptian culture. Vol 39, 2010). pp. 321–339.
 Miroslav Verner. The Pyramids Universe Books, New 1998, pp. 415–416.

22nd-century BC Pharaohs
Pharaohs of the Eighth Dynasty of Egypt
Pyramids of the Eighth Dynasty of Egypt
Saqqara